Laura Gagliardi (born 6 April 1968 in Bologna) is an Italian theoretical and computational chemist and Richard and Kathy Leventhal Professor of Chemistry and Molecular Engineering at the University of Chicago. She is known for her work on the development of electronic structure methods and their use for understanding complex chemical systems.

Education 
Gagliardi earned her Master of Science degree in chemistry at the University of Bologna in 1992 for which she was awarded 'Toso Montanari' for the student with the highest-mark graduation in chemistry. She earned her PhD at the same university in 1997. She was a postdoctoral research associate at the University of Cambridge from 1998 to 1999.

Career and research

Gagliardi became an assistant professor at the University of Palermo in 2002. In 2005, she became associate professor at the University of Geneva in Switzerland, and in 2009 she joined the University of Minnesota as a professor of chemistry. She was director of the Nanoporous Materials Genome Center from 2012 to 2014 and has been director of the Inorganometallic Catalyst Design Center since 2014. She was the director of the Chemical Theory Center from 2011 to 2020. She was appointed as Distinguished McKnight University Professor in 2014 and awarded a McKnight Presidential Endowed Chair in 2018. In 2020, she joined the University of Chicago as the Richard and Kathy Leventhal Professor in chemistry and molecular engineering. She is the director of the Chicago Center for Theoretical Chemistry.

Her research focuses on the development of electronic structure methods and their use for understanding complex chemical systems. These systems have practical applications in terms of sustainability and nuclear waste management. Her work with theoretical chemistry also showed that a certain form of uranium forms quintuple bonds, which changed the way chemists view interactions between metal atoms.

She currently serves as Editor-in-Chief for the Journal of Chemical Theory and Computation, and has served as an Associate Editor for the Journal of the American Chemical Society (2021–present), the Journal of Chemical Theory and Computation (2016-2020), and is a member of the Editorial Advisory Board of the following journals: Journal of Catalysis (2018–present), Chemical Reviews (2015-present), ACS Central Science (2014–present), The Journal of the American Chemical Society (2013-2018), Inorganic Chemistry (2014-2016), Theoretical Chemistry Accounts (2009–present), Journal of Chemical Theory and Computation (2012-2016), and the Journal of Physical Chemistry (2011-2016).

Honours and awards
 2022: Elected Member of the Deutsche Akademie der Naturforscher Leopoldina
 2021: Elected Member of the National Academy of Sciences
 2021: Elected Foreign Member of the Accademia dei Lincei
 2021: Faraday Lectureship Prize
 2020: Peter Debye Award in Physical Chemistry of the American Chemical Society
 2020: Elected Member of the American Academy of Arts and Sciences
 2019: Award in Theoretical Chemistry from the Physical Chemistry Division of the American Chemical Society
2019: Elected Member of the International Academy of Quantum Molecular Science
 2018: Humboldt Research Award
 2018: Elected Member of the Academia Europaea
2017: Elected Member of the World Association of Theoretical and Computational Chemists
 2016: Elected Fellow of the Royal Society of Chemistry
 2016: Bourke Award of the Royal Society of Chemistry
 2016: Isaiah Shavitt Lectureship Award, Technion
 2016: Elected Fellow of the American Physical Society
 2004: Annual Award of the International Academy of Quantum Molecular Sciences

Personal life
Gagliardi is married to Christopher J. Cramer; the couple has three children from a prior marriage.

References

External links 
 The Gagliardi Research Group

1968 births
Living people
Humboldt Research Award recipients
Fellows of the American Physical Society
Members of Academia Europaea
Fellows of the Royal Society of Chemistry
Members of the United States National Academy of Sciences
Theoretical chemists
Inorganic chemists
Organic chemists
Computational chemists
University of Chicago faculty
20th-century American chemists
21st-century American chemists